Salt, also referred to as table salt or by its chemical formula NaCl (sodium chloride), is an ionic compound made of sodium and chloride ions. All life depends on its chemical properties to survive. It has been used by humans for thousands of years, from food preservation to seasoning. Salt's ability to preserve food was a founding contributor to the development of civilization. It helped eliminate dependence on seasonal availability of food, and made it possible to transport food over large distances. However, salt was often difficult to obtain, so it was a highly valued trade item, and was considered a form of currency by certain people. Many salt roads, such as the via Salaria in Italy, had been established by the Bronze Age.

All through history, availability of salt has been pivotal to civilization. In Britain, the suffix "-wich" in a place name sometimes means it was once a source of salt, as in Northwich and Droitwich, although other - wich towns are so named from the Saxon 'wic', meaning fortified dwelling or emporium. The Natron Valley was a key region that supported the Egyptian Empire to its north, because it supplied it with a kind of salt that came to be called by its name, natron. Today, salt is almost universally accessible, relatively cheap, and often iodized.

Sources 
Salt comes from two main sources: sea water and the sodium chloride mineral halite (also known as rock salt). Rock salt occurs in vast beds of sedimentary evaporite minerals that result from the drying up of enclosed lakes, playas, and seas. In the United States and Canada extensive underground beds extend from the Appalachian basin of western New York through parts of Ontario and under much of the Michigan basin. Other deposits are in Texas, Ohio, Kansas, New Mexico, Nova Scotia, and Saskatchewan. In the United Kingdom underground beds are found in Cheshire and around Droitwich. Salzburg, Austria, was named "the city of salt" for its mines. High-quality rock salt was cut in medieval Transylvania, Maramureş and Southern Poland (Wieliczka). Tuzla in Bosnia and Herzegovina was named in Hungarian Só (salt) from the twelfth century on and later "place of salt" by Turks.

Salt is extracted from underground beds either by mining or by solution mining using water to dissolve the salt. In solution mining the salt reaches the surface as brine, from which the water is evaporated leaving salt crystals.

History

Ancient world 
Early neolithic salt production, dating to approximately 6,000 BCE, has been identified at an excavation, in Poiana Slatinei-Lunca, Romania.

Solnitsata, the earliest known town in Europe, was built around a salt production facility. Located in present-day Bulgaria, the town is thought by archaeologists to have accumulated wealth by supplying salt throughout the Balkans.

Salt was of high value to the Jews, Greeks, Tamils, Chinese, Hittites and other peoples of antiquity. 
In the early years of the Roman Republic, with the growth of the city of Rome, roads were built to make transportation of salt to the capital city easier. An example was the Via Salaria (originally a Sabine trail), leading from Rome to the Adriatic Sea. The Adriatic, having a higher salinity due to its shallow depth, had more productive solar ponds compared with those of the Tyrrhenian Sea, much closer to Rome. The word "salary" comes from the Latin word for salt. The persistent modern claim that the Roman Legions were sometimes paid in salt is baseless; a salārium may have been an allowance paid to Roman soldiers for the purchase of salt, but even that is not well established. 

During the late Roman Empire and throughout the Middle Ages salt was a precious commodity carried along the salt roads into the heartland of the Germanic tribes. Caravans consisting of as many as forty thousand camels traversed four hundred miles of the Sahara bearing salt to inland markets in the Sahel, sometimes trading salt for slaves: Timbuktu was a noted salt and slave market.

Salt in Chinese history was both a driver of technological development and a stable source of revenue for the imperial government.

Cities and wars 

Salt has played a prominent role in determining the power and location of the world's great cities. Liverpool rose from just a small English port to become the prime exporting port for the salt dug in the great Cheshire salt mines and thus became the entrepôt for much of the world's salt in the 19th century.

Salt created and destroyed empires. The salt mines of Poland led to a vast kingdom in the 16th century, only to be demolished when Germans brought in sea salt (which most of the world considered superior to rock salt).

Cities, states and duchies along the salt roads exacted heavy duties and taxes for the salt passing through their territories. This practice even caused the formation of cities, such as the city of Munich in 1158, when the then Duke of Bavaria, Henry the Lion, decided that the bishops of Freising no longer needed their salt revenue.

The gabelle—a hated French salt tax—was enacted in 1286 and maintained until 1790. Because of the gabelles, common salt was of such a high value that it caused mass population shifts and exodus, attracted invaders and caused wars.

In American history, salt has been a major factor in outcomes of wars. In the Revolutionary War, Loyalists intercepted Patriot salt shipments in an attempt to interfere with their ability to preserve food. During the War of 1812, salt brine was used to pay American soldiers in the field, as the federal government was too poor to pay them with money. Before Lewis and Clark set out for the Louisiana Territory, President Jefferson in his address to Congress mentioned a mountain of salt, 180 miles long and 45 wide, supposed to lie near the Missouri River, which would have been of inconceivable value, as a reason for their expedition.

During the Indian independence movement, Mahatma Gandhi organized the Salt Satyagraha protest to demonstrate against the British salt tax.

Salt production in England

Evidence of early neolithic salt pans, dating to 3766–3647 BCE, have been unearthed in Yorkshire. Evidence of bronze age production, c. 1,400 BCE, has been identified in Somerset. Iron age production in Hampshire. Roman Rock Salt production in Cheshire. Salt was produced from both mines and sea in Medieval England. The open-pan salt making method was used along the Lincolnshire coast and in the saltmarshes of Bitterne Manor on the banks of the River Itchen in Hampshire where salt production was a notable industry.

Wich and wych are names associated (but not exclusively) with brine springs or wells in England. Originally derived from the Latin vicus, meaning "place", by the 11th century use of the 'wich' suffix in placenames was associated with places with a specialised function including that of salt production. Several English places carry the suffix and are historically related to salt, including the four Cheshire 'wiches' of Middlewich, Nantwich, Northwich and Leftwich (a small village south of Northwich), and Droitwich in Worcestershire. Middlewich, Nantwich, Northwich and Droitwich are known as the "Domesday Wiches" due to their mention in the Domesday Book of 1086, "an indication of the significance of the salt-working towns in the economy of the region, and indeed of the country". Salt was very important to Europe because it was hard to trade with Africa and they needed to produce it themselves.

Salt trade 

Monopolies over salt production and trade were essential aspects of government revenue in imperial China and retained its significance until 20th century.

During modern times, it became more profitable to sell salted food than pure salt. Thus sources of food to salt went hand in hand with salt making. The British controlled saltworks in the Bahamas as well as North American cod fisheries. The search for oil in the late 19th and early 20th centuries used the technology and methods pioneered by salt miners, even to the degree that they looked for oil where salt domes were located.

Salt production 

On an industrial scale, salt is produced in one of two principal ways: the evaporation of salt water (brine) or by mining. Evaporation can either be solar evaporation or using some heating device.

Solar evaporation of seawater 
In the correct climate (one for which the ratio of evaporation to rainfall is suitably high) it is possible to use solar evaporation of sea water to produce salt. Brine is evaporated in a linked set of ponds until the solution is sufficiently concentrated by the final pond so that the salt crystallizes on the pond's floor.

Open pan production from brine 

One of the traditional methods of salt production in more temperate climates is using open pans. In open-pan production, salt brine is heated in large, shallow open pans. The earliest examples of this date back to prehistoric times and the pans were made of either a type of ceramic called briquetage, or lead. Later examples were made from iron. This change coincided with a change from wood to coal for the purpose of heating the brine. Brine would be pumped into the pans and concentrated by the heat of the fire burning underneath. As crystals of salt formed, these would be raked out and more brine added.

Closed pan production under vacuum 

The open pan salt works has effectively been replaced with a closed pan system where the brine solution is evaporated under a partial vacuum.

Salt mines 
In the second half of the 19th century, industrial mining and new drilling techniques made the discovery of more and deeper deposits possible, increasing mine salt's share of the market. Although mining salt was generally more expensive than extracting it from brine via solar evaporation of seawater, the introduction of this new source reduced the price of salt due to a reduction of monopolization. Extraction of salt from brine is still heavily used; for example, vacuum salt produced by British Salt in Middlewich has 57% of the UK market for salt used in cooking.

Salt from ashes 

In traditional salt production in the Visayas Islands of the Philippines, salt is made from coconut husks, driftwood, or other plant matter soaked in seawater for at least several months. These are burned into ash then seawater is run through the ashes on a filter. The resulting brine is then evaporated in containers. Coconut milk is sometimes added to the brine before evaporation. The practice is endangered due to competition with cheap industrially-produced commercial salt. Only two traditions survive to the present day: asín tibuok and túltul (or dúkdok).

Other salt uses 

The earliest systematic exposition of the different kinds of salts, its uses, and the methods of its extraction was published in China around 2700 BCE. Hippocrates encouraged his fellow healers to use salt water to heal various ailments by immersing their patients in sea water. The ancient Greeks continued this, and in 1753, English author and physician Richard Russell published The Uses of Sea Water in which he declared that salt was a "common defence against the corruption of…bodies" and "contribut[es] greatly to all cures".

In Ethiopia blocks of salt, called amoleh, were carved from the salt pans of the Afar Depression, especially around Lake Afrera, then carried by camel west to Atsbi and Ficho in the highland, whence traders distributed them throughout the rest of Ethiopia, as far south as the Kingdom of Kaffa. These salt blocks served as a form of currency.

See also 

Alberger process
Bath salts
Cerro de la Sal (Salt Mountain), Peru  
Fish sauce
Garum
Illinois Salines
International Salt Co. v. United States
Iodised salt
James Ford (pirate)
Joy Morton 
John Crenshaw
Lüneburg Saltworks
Mineral lick (salt lick)
Morton Salt
Red hill (salt making)
Saltern
Salt evaporation pond
Salt in Cheshire
Salt industry in Ghana
Salt in the American Civil War
Salt March (India)
Salt Riot (Moscow uprising of 1648)
Seawater greenhouse
Anikey Stroganov (Solvychegodsk and Perm salterns)
Sülze Saltworks

References

Further reading 
 
 The Role of Salt in Eastern North American Prehistory

 
Salt